Gian Chand is an Indian sports shooter. He competed in the mixed 50 metre rifle prone event at the 1980 Summer Olympics.

References

External links
 

Year of birth missing (living people)
Living people
Indian male sport shooters
Olympic shooters of India
Shooters at the 1980 Summer Olympics
Place of birth missing (living people)